Bridal veil may refer to:

The veil worn by a bride
Bridal Veil, Oregon, an unincorporated community
Bridal Veil Falls (disambiguation), a number of waterfalls
Gibasis pellucida, a houseplant commonly known as 'Tahitian bridal veil'

See also
Bridalveil Creek Campground